Drowning is  respiratory impairment from being in or under a liquid.

Drown may also refer to:

 Drown (short story collection), a short-story collection by Junot Díaz
 Drown (surname), a surname and list of people with the surnames Drown and Drowne
 DROWN attack, a computer security exploit

Songs 
 "Drown" (Bring Me the Horizon song), 2014
 "Drown" (Martin Garrix song), 2020
 "Drown" (The Smashing Pumpkins song), 1992
 "Drown" (Theory of a Deadman song), 2014
 "Drown", by 40 Below Summer from Invitation to the Dance
 "Drown", by Blindspott from End the Silence
 "Drown", by Carolina Liar from Wild Blessed Freedom
 "Drown", by Front Porch Step from Aware
 "Drown", by Gravity Kills from Perversion
 "Drown", by Limp Bizkit from Results May Vary
 "Drown", by Son Volt from Trace
 "Drown", by Three Days Grace from the eponymous album
 "Drown", by Tyler Joseph from No Phun Intended

See also 
 "Drowned" (song), by The Who
 "Drowned", by Candlebox from Lucy
 Drowning (disambiguation)